Raghopur Assembly constituency is an assembly constituency in Vaishali district in the Indian state of Bihar.

Lalu Prasad Yadav won this seat twice, his wife Rabri Devi won it thrice, and they both served as Chief Minister while representing this seat. Their son Tejashwi Yadav has also won it twice (2015,2020) and been Deputy CM and Leader of Opposition while holding it. Rabri Devi has also lost from this seat once, in 2010 from Satish Kumar (JDU). Currently Satish Kumar is a member of Bharatiya Janta Party.

Overview
As per Delimitation of Parliamentary and Assembly constituencies Order, 2008, No. 128 Raghopur Assembly constituency is composed of the following: Raghopur and Bidupur community development blocks.

Raghopur Assembly constituency is part of No. 21 Hajipur (Lok Sabha constituency) (SC).

Members of the Legislative Assembly 

^ denotes by-poll

Election results

2020

2015

2010

Vidhan Sabha Elections Oct-2005
 Rabri Devi (RJD) : 35,891 votes    
 Satish Kumar (JD-U) : 30,601
 Pramod Kumar (Ram Vilas Paswan's LJP, and also his driver) : 15,137

Vidhan Sabha Elections Feb-2005
 Rabri Devi (RJD) : 48,460
 Rajiv Ranjan (Ram Vilas Paswan's LJP) : 23,419

Vidhan Sabha Elections 2000
 Laloo Prasad (RJD) : 70,134 votes  
 Vishundeo Rai (JD-U) : 41006
 Lalu Yadav retained Danapur seat and vacated this seat for his wife Rabri Devi.

By-poll 2000
 Rabri Devi (RJD) : 108,768 votes  
 Veera Devi	F	JD(U)	46951

Assembly Elections 1967
 H.N. Singh (BJS) : 23,145 votes
 R.B. Rai (INC) : 20,043

References

External links
 

Assembly constituencies of Bihar
Politics of Vaishali district